Blackwater Residential Historic District is a national historic district located at Blackwater, Cooper County, Missouri.  The district encompasses 25 contributing buildings in a predominantly residential section of Blackwater.  It developed between about 1891 and 1946, and includes representative examples of Queen Anne and Bungalow / American Craftsman style architecture.  Notable buildings include the H. D. Quigg House (1891), Fray House (1905), W. L. Abney House (c. 1919), Tom J. Sims House (c. 1915), Ray McClain House (1932), and Emily Hill House (c. 1909).

It was listed on the National Register of Historic Places in 2009.

References

Historic districts on the National Register of Historic Places in Missouri
Queen Anne architecture in Missouri
Bungalow architecture in Missouri
National Register of Historic Places in Cooper County, Missouri
American Craftsman architecture